Kilosa District is one of the six districts of the Morogoro Region of Tanzania. Its administrative seat is the town of Kilosa. It is bordered to the north by the Manyara Region, to the northeast by the Tanga Region, to the east by Mvomero District, to the southeast by Morogoro Rural District, to the south by Kilombero District, to the southwest by the Iringa Region and to the west by the Dodoma Region. Kilosa District is home to Mikumi National Park.

According to the 2002 Tanzania National Census, the population of the Kilosa District was 489,513.

Administrative subdivisions

Constituencies
For parliamentary elections, Tanzania is divided into constituencies. As of the 2015 elections Kilosa District had two constituencies:
 Kilosa Constituency
 Mikumi Constituency

Divisions
, Kilosa District was administratively divided into nine divisions.

1997 divisions
The nine 1997 divisions were:
 Gairo Division, the northernmost part of Kilosa District,
 Kilosa Division, 
 Kilosa Mijni (municipality)
 Kimamba Division,
 Magole Division,
 Masanze Division,
 Mikumi Division,
 Rudewa Division,
 Ulaya Division, the central part of southern Kilosa District.

Wards
, Kilosa District was administratively divided into forty- six wards:

In 2012 the following eight wards became part of the newly created Gairo District:

 Gairo
 Mandege
 Rubeho
 Chagongwe
 Chanjale
 Kibedya
 Chakwale
 Iyogwe

The thirty-eight wards remaining in Kilosa district from 2012:

 Berega
 Chanzuru
 Dumila
 Kasiki
 Kidete
 Kidodi
 Kilangali
 Kimamba 'A'
 Kimamba 'B'
 Kisanga
 Lumbiji
 Luhembe
 Lumuma
 Mabwerebwere
 Magole
 Magomeni
 Magubike
 Malolo (Tanzania)
 Mamboya
 Masanze
 Mbumi
 Mikumi
 Mkwatani
 Msowero
 Rudewa
 Ulaya
 Uleling'ombe
 Vidunda
 Zombo
 Mamoyo

Transport 
The town of Kilosa has a station on the Central Line of Tanzanian Railways.  It is also a junction for a branch railway to the break-of-gauge transshipment station at Kidatu.

Notes

 
Districts of Morogoro Region